Dancing with the Stars is an Irish reality television series, airing on RTÉ One that started on 8 January 2017, and is currently hosted by Jennifer Zamparelli and Doireann Garrihy. The show is based on the original UK version, Strictly Come Dancing and is part of the Dancing with the Stars franchise. The judging panel consists of Arthur Gourounlian, Loraine Barry and Brian Redmond. and formerly Julian Benson from seasons 1–4.

Production
In August 2016, it was confirmed that RTÉ One would broadcast an Irish version of Dancing with the Stars, which would replace the successful The Voice of Ireland, which was cancelled in order for the broadcaster to order the new show. A producer of the show commented, "We've got fantastic production people in Ireland who, I believe, deliver a show that's comparable with any of those shows on a fraction of the budget. So we're looking forward to the task of doing this equally the same way."

Format
The format of the series follows celebrities being paired up with professional dancers, who perform predetermined dances each week for judges' scores and public votes, with the couple with the lowest number of points being eliminated, until the winning couple remains.

Judges and hosts
Color key

On 18 December 2016, RTÉ confirmed that Julian Benson, Loraine Barry and Brian Redmond would be the judges on the programme. The show’s creative director, Darren Bennett, stood in for Benson at various points throughout Benson’s time on the show when he was absent due to illness.

People in the running to be host of the show included former Westlife musician and 2012 Strictly Come Dancing contestant Nicky Byrne; as well as popular radio host Ray D'Arcy, though D'Arcy ruled himself out of the running in August 2016. In October 2016, it was reported that Marty Whelan had auditioned to host the show. In November, it was reported that Amanda Byram had been selected as one of the hosts. In December, it was confirmed that Byrne would host alongside Byram. It was also confirmed that Bláthnaid Treacy would be hosting RTÉ Two spin-off show, Can't Stop Dancing, airing on Friday nights before the live shows.

On 28 August 2018, after two series, Amanda Byram confirmed that she would not be returning as a presenter in 2019.
On 30 October 2018, Jennifer Zamparelli was confirmed as Byram's replacement.

On 12 November 2021, it was announced that the series would return after one-year hiatus following the COVID-19 pandemic. Hosts, Zamaparelli and Byrne were slated to return alongside judges, Barry and Redmond. Julian Benson would not return for the fifth series, being replaced by choreographer and creative director, Arthur Gourounlian.

On 25 August 2022, Nicky Byrne announced that he would be stepping away from hosting duties after five seasons to focus on Westlife touring commitments. On 7 October 2022, it was announced that Doireann Garrihy would take over from Byrne as co-host for the sixth season alongside Zamparelli.

Professional dancers and their partners

Key:
 Winner of the series
 Finalist (2nd/3rd/4th place)
 First elimination of the series
 Withdrew from the series
 Participating in current series
Week 7 of Series 1 and Week 6 of Series 2, 3 and 4 was 'Switch-Up Week' in which the celebrities danced with different pros for one week only. The table above reflects this as it excludes each pro's regular celebrity partner's Switch-Up Week score and includes their Switch-Up Week partner's score.
Series 4 ended a week early due to the COVID-19 pandemic; therefore, there were four competitors in the final instead of three.
Series 5 had 12 couples unlike series 1-4, so 4 competitors were in the final once again.
Series 5 saw Ervinas Merfeldas step in for Denys Samson and Stephen Vincent for Weeks 9 and 10 respectively, and Emily Barker step in for Salome Chachua in Week 10, due to illness. The scores are reflected in the tables above and added to the stand-in professionals totals.
Series 6 saw Maurizio Benenato originally partner, Brooke Scullion. However, in the third week of the competition, Benenato left due to unforeseen circumstances and was replaced with Robert Rowiński. The scores are reflected in the table above with Benenato accounting for Scullion's first two scores and Rowiński accounting for Week 3's scores onwards.

Overall Highest and lowest scoring performances 
The best and worst performances over each series in each dance according to the judges' scale are as follows. Team Dances and Marathons are not on this list.

Ranking of couples
This table only counts for single dances scored on a traditional 30-points scale. It does not include the Team Dance or Marathon scores.

Number of perfect scores

The scores presented below represent the perfect scores which the celebrities gained in their original season. Perfect scores awarded in Team Dances are not included within this table.

By Professional:

Series overview

Episodes

Series 1 (2017)

The first series of Dancing with the Stars started on 8 January 2017 and finished on 26 March 2017.

Series 2 (2018)

The second series began on 7 January 2018 and finished on 25 March 2018.

Series 3 (2019)

The third series began on 6 January 2019 and finished on 24 March 2019.

Series 4 (2020)

The fourth series began on 5 January 2020 and finished on 15 March 2020 due to the COVID-19 pandemic.

Series 5 (2022)

The fifth series was postponed in late July 2020 due to an outbreak of the COVID-19 pandemic. The series returned on 9 January 2022 and ended on 27 March 2022.

Series 6 (2023)

The sixth series began on 8 January 2023 and ended on 19 March 2023.

References

External links
 

 
2017 Irish television series debuts
Irish reality television series
Irish music television shows
RTÉ original programming
Irish television series based on British television series